Gharaonda (The Nest) is a 1977 Hindi drama film, produced and directed by Bhimsain. The film stars Amol Palekar, Zarina Wahab, Shreeram Lagoo and Jalal Agha. The music is by Jaidev.

Plot
Gharonda explores the lives of Sudip (Amol Palekar) and Chhaya (Zarina Wahab) who belong to the middle class in Mumbai and work in the same office. Chhaya is sharing a one-room flat with her younger brother, her elder brother and sister-in law. Sudip has rented a room with three other men. Sudip and Chhaya fall in love with each other and plan to get married as soon as they have a house made for themselves. In this process, they save every penny to build a corpus for buying a house. They go house hunting looking for an abode which will suit their budgets. After finally investing in a flat in one building, they are all excited about their future. After a few months, the builder who is a fraud, absconds with their money. Sudip's roommate (Sadhu Mehar), who has also invested in the building, commits suicide. The building project is abandoned and all the money of investors goes down the drain. The couple is shocked and does not know how to react. They just cannot imagine having to start once again from scratch.

In the meantime, the owner of their firm Mr. Modi (Shriram Lagoo), starts taking an interest in Chhaya as she looks similar to his late wife and eventually proposes to her. Modi is a rich, ageing widower who is also a heart patient. Chhaya is aghast at the proposal but Sudip sees a big opportunity in this. He tells her that since Modi is a heart patient, he is expected to die within a few months. After that, they can marry and their problems of house and wealth would be solved forever. Chhaya is disillusioned with Sudip for even suggesting such a thing and with a lot of reluctance, accepts Modi's proposal, especially as it gives her a chance to send her brother abroad for higher education.

Modi and Chhaya's married life starts awkwardly, but soon she takes on the role of a dutiful wife. Sudip keeps visiting her on some pretext and also to check on Modi's health. He is dismayed to find Modi in the pink of health. Modi, in fact, after marriage cheers up and this has a positive effect on his physical condition. Sudip is disheartened and resigns from his job after a brief talk with Modi. Chhaya rebukes Sudip about his constant visits and they have a confrontation which is overheard by Modi. He has a heart attack – an event which once again stirs hope in Sudip's heart. But Chhaya very patiently nurses Modi back to health and Sudip finally decides to leave the city. But on railway station, Modi tells Sudip that he can marry Chhaya (after their divorce). But he does not accept it and also firmly tells him that he is not going to leave the city and will start all over again without using any shortcut this time.

The film depicts how brutal this workaholic Mumbai city is and how difficult it is for a common man to fulfill his basic dreams such as marriage and home ownership.

Cast
Amol Palekar as Sudeep
Zarina Wahab as Chhaya
Shreeram Lagoo as Modi
Dina Pathak as Guha's Mother
T. P. Jain as Bade Babu
Sudha Chopra as Chhaya's Bhabi 
Sadhu Meher as Guha (Sudeep's Roommate)
Jalal Agha as Abdul (Sudeep's Roommate)

Crew
Director : Bhimsain
Producer : Bhimsain
Editor : Waman B. Bhosle
Story : Dr. Shanker Shesh
Screenplay : Gulzar
Cinematographer : Binod Pradhan, A. K. Bir, D. G. Debudhar, Virendra Saini
Costume Designer : Shammi, Waheeda
Narrator : Gulzar
Music Director : Jaidev
Lyrics : Gulzar

Music

Awards

References

External links 
 

1977 films
Films scored by Jaidev
1970s Hindi-language films
Indian drama films